'The Passion of the Christ: Songs is an album of songs inspired by the 2004 film The Passion of the Christ. It was produced by Mark Joseph and Tim Cook and executive produced by Mel Gibson. It won the 2005 GMA Music Award for Special Event Album of the Year.

Track listing

Awards
In 2005, the album won a Dove Award for Special Event Album of the Year at the 36th GMA Dove Awards.

References

External links
Official website

2004 compilation albums
The Passion of the Christ
Lost Keyword albums